The Association of Learned and Professional Society Publishers (ALPSP) is an international trade association of non-profit publishers created in 1972. It is the largest association of scholarly and professional publishers in the world, with nearly 300 members in 30 countries.

ALPSP awards
The ALPSP Awards recognise excellence and innovation in scholarly communications. The winners are announced at the ALPSP Conference.

Learned Publishing
Published in collaboration with the Society for Scholarly Publishing (SSP), ALPSP publishes a peer reviewed quarterly journal called Learned Publishing, covering the field of scholarly publishing.
The journal is freely available to all members of ALPSP and SSP. The journal is published on behalf of ALPSP by Wiley. The journal is indexed and has an Impact Factor, and is  considered to be of a high level and to offer stimulating insights on the evolution of digital publishing.

The current Editor-in-Chief is Pippa Smart, and the North American Editor is Lettie Conrad.

Events
ALPSP runs a series of events including training workshops, seminars, webinars and other events at various meetings, such as Frankfurt and London Book Fairs. It runs a three-day annual conference that attracts several hundred participants from around the world.

See also
 List of university presses
 List of academic journals associated with learned and professional societies

References

External links
 

Academic publishing
Mass media in Hertfordshire
Organisations based in Hertfordshire
Publishing organizations
Organizations established in 1972
Organisations based in West Sussex